Perren may refer to:

Bernhard Perren (1928–1960), Swiss alpine skier and mountain guide
Clinton Perren (born 1975), Australian first-class cricketer who played for Queensland
Diego Perren (born 1965), Swiss curler and Olympic champion
Freddie Perren (1943–2004), American songwriter, record producer, arranger, and orchestra conductor
George Perren (1827–1909), English tenor active in both concert and opera
Kevin van der Perren (born 1982), Belgian figure skater
Perren Baker (1877–1974), Canadian politician who served as Alberta's Minister of Education from 1921 until 1935

See also
Mount Perren, located on the border of Alberta and British Columbia on the Continental Divide
Peren (disambiguation)
Perrin (disambiguation)
Perron (disambiguation)